David Jacobus 'Divan' Serfontein (born 3 Augustus 1954 in Krugersdorp, South Africa) is a former Springbok rugby union player.

Playing career

Provincial career
Serfontein started his rugby career in 1974 at  where he was selected for the club's under-20 age group team. He was soon afterwards selected for the Western Province under-20 team and in his first match he played alongside the future South African cricketer, Peter Kirsten. In 1976 Serfontein made his provincial first team debut for Western Province against the touring All Blacks side of Andy Leslie. Western Province won this match 12–11.

At the start of the 1981 rugby season, Serfontein was appointed as Western Province captain. He went on to captain his province 51 times and also led his team to three consecutive Currie Cup titles, in 1982, 1983 and 1984.

International career
Serfontein made his test debut for the Springboks on 31 May 1980 at his home ground, Newlands in Cape Town against the touring British and Irish Lions team, captained by Bill Beaumont. He also scored his first test try in this match. The test series against the Lions, was followed with tests against the South American Jaguars, France, Ireland, New Zealand ( the so-called Rebel Tour) and England.

Serfontein was selected as captain for the two test matches against the touring South American Jaguars in October 1984 and in doing so became the 39th Springbok test captain. Serfontein retired from rugby union at the end of the 1984 season, having played 100 matches for Western Province and 19 consecutive test matches for the Springboks. He also scored 3 test tries.

Test history

Accolades
Serfontein was named the SA Rugby player of the Year for 1982.

See also
List of South Africa national rugby union players – Springbok no. 508

References

1954 births
Living people
South African rugby union players
South Africa international rugby union players
Western Province (rugby union) players
Rugby union scrum-halves
South Africa national rugby union team captains
People from Krugersdorp
Rugby union players from Gauteng